The 2022–23 BCHL season will be the 61st season of the British Columbia Hockey League (BCHL). The eighteen teams from the Coastal and Interior Conferences will play 54 game schedules. The 2022 BCHL showcase is expected to take place near the start of the season.
Many other special events are due to take place during the season, such as the All-Star and Top Prospect games to be held in Penticton in January, as well as the BCHL Road Show taking place in Burns Lake on February 18 and 19, 2023.

League changes
Most changes to the league occurred on the back-end for the season, with a focus on team and official development. The use of video review, which was endorsed and brought in by one team and expanded to more come this season, is expected to be adopted league-wide over the next four years.

During the offseason, the league renamed several of its year-end awards. The Goaltending Award, awarded to the top goaltender every year, was named the Michael Garteig trophy, named after former Powell River Kings and Penticton Vees goaltender Michael Garteig. The Defensive Award, given to the top defenceman, was renamed the Blair Campbell award, named after former BCHL defenceman Blair Campbell. Finally, the award for Broadcaster of the Year was renamed the Jim Hughson Award, named after former Vancouver Canucks and Hockey Night In Canada Play by Play broadcaster Jim Hughson, who got his start in the BCHL. The league also created two new awards: the Jeff Tambellini Trophy, to be awarded to the playoff MVP, and the Kyle Turris community award, awarded to a player on each team that best represents their team in their communities.

Standings
Note:  GP = Games Played, W = Wins, L = Losses, OTL = Overtime Losses, Pts = Points

Standings as of October 10, 2022

Up to date standings are available on the league website.

See also
2022 in ice hockey
2023 in ice hockey

References

External links
Official Website of the British Columbia Hockey League

BCHL
British Columbia Hockey League seasons